US Post Office-Morrisania -- originally Station "T" -- is a historic post office building located at Morrisania in The Bronx, New York, United States. It was built in 1936, and designed by consulting architect William Dewey Foster for the Office of the Supervising Architect.  The building is a two-story, five bay wide brick building with a hipped roof and a one bay recessed wing in the Colonial Revival style.  It features an arcade of five recessed brick round arches with limestone keystones.

It was listed on the National Register of Historic Places in 1988.

References

Morrisania
Government buildings completed in 1936
Colonial Revival architecture in New York City
National Register of Historic Places in the Bronx
Morrisania, Bronx